Anjal Petti 520 is a 1969 Indian Tamil-language comedy film directed by T. N. Balu and produced by N. Vasudeva Menon. The film stars Sivaji Ganesan, B. Saroja Devi, M. N. Nambiar and Nagesh. It was released on 27 June 1969.

Plot 

Prabhu is Chennai Manager in baby food company whose head office at Madurai. He is very talented Manager and his MD assures him promotion to General Manager position. Suddenly Prabhu gets information as his MD is not giving promotion. Prabhu becomes angry and writes his resignation abusing his company MD. And he drops the letter in Post box 520 (Anjalpetti 520). Next day Prabhu receives telegram bringing his promotion. Then Prabhu realises his mistake and willing to take back the letter he posted to Post box 520. There starts the story and he chasing the letter and he got messed up with conspiracy by villains and finally he come out from all problems.

Cast 
Sivaji Ganesan as Prabhu
B. Saroja Devi as Saratha
Major Sundarrajan as Sivachidambaram
M. N. Nambiar as Nagarajan
S. V. Ramadas as Moorthy
K. D. Santhanam as Somasundaram
Senthamarai as Karmegam
R. Balasubramaniam as Kanagasabai
K. R. Ramsingh as Mangat
K. A. Thangavelu as Kanakkappar
Nagesh as Chandru/Stephan
Manorama as Stella
Thengai Srinivasan as Ananth
Vennira Aadai Moorthy as Somu
Suruli Rajan as Ramanujam
Typist Gopu as Gopu
O. A. K. Thevar as Climax Lawyer
Vijaya Lalitha as Dancer
Seethalakshmi as Prabhu Aunty
Natarajan Iyer as Climax Judge
S. A. Kannan as Ravanamoorthy
Natarajan as Court Dawali
Comedy Shanmugam as Post Man

Soundtrack 
The music was composed by R. Govardhanam, while lyrics were written by Kannadasan and Vaali.

Reception 
The Indian Express wrote, "Stringing together a few incidents, interesting in themselves but violating logic does not guarantee good entertainment, let alone make a novel movie."

References

External links 
 

1960s Tamil-language films
1969 comedy films
1969 films
Indian black-and-white films
Indian comedy films